The San Jose Missions were a minor league baseball team located in San Jose, California. The Missions played from 1977 to 1978 as members of the AAA Pacific Coast League. The Missions name returned in 1979 under a new franchise that played in the  Class A-Advanced California League. In 1982, with a new affiliation, the club was renamed the San Jose Expos.

History
The history of the Missions is a tale of two franchises linked by a common owner. The initial Missions club came into existence with Joe Gagliardi, owner of the San Jose Bees, making a deal to lease the AAA Pacific Coast league Sacramento franchise from Bob Piccinini. Piccinini's Solons were without a ballpark as Hughes Stadium was in poor condition and had failed to meet earthquake standards. Gagliardi relocated the club to San Jose for the 1977 where the team played as an affiliate of the Oakland Athletics. Former A's player Rene Lachemann was tabbed as manager. The Missions served as the A's taxi squad with players being shuttled to Oakland throughout the season. The team trudged to 64-80 finish.   

The team returned in 1978 as an affiliate of the Seattle Mariners. This was the Mariners' first dedicated AAA team. Rene Lachemann, who would go on to manage the Mariners from 1981-1983, returned as manager. The Missions finished year at the bottom of the league in both the standings and attendance. Following the season, owner Bob Piccinini ended his lease of the club and sold it for a reported $175,000 to Dennis Job. Job promptly moved the franchise to Utah were they would become the Ogden A's. 

With San Jose vacant, Joe Gagliardi gained approval for a California League team. The club signed an affiliation the Seattle Mariners. Gagliardi resurrected the Missions name as the club accompanied the Santa Clara Padres in the expansion of the California League in 1979. With a roster that included Dave Henderson, Orlando Mercado, and Jim Maler the Missions won the south division title with a record of 89-51. The Missions advanced past the Visalia Oaks in divisional round of the playoffs. San Jose faced the Stockton Ports in the best of five games league championship series. The Missions bested the Ports in a series that went the full tilt to claim the California League crown. The Missions and Mariners continued their relationship into 1980. San Jose finished the year at 73-66, only a half game behind the south division leading Fresno Giants. Despite a runner-up rerecord, the Missions missed out in the post season as the first half winning Giants and second half winning Oaks advanced under the split season format.  
 
The Missions played the 1981 season as independent club. The team finished the year at 53-87, placing last in a single division California League that had dropped to an eight team circuit. Following the season the franchise was sold to Ohio businessman, Peter Kern. In signing a player development contract with the Montreal Expos. The club adopted their parent club's moniker becoming the San Jose Expos.

Ballpark
The Missions played at San Jose Municipal Stadium, now known as Excite Ballpark. The stadium is in use today as home of the San Jose Giants.

Season Records
Pacific Coast League

California League

References

External links
 Stats Crew San Jose Missions

Defunct baseball teams in California
Oakland Athletics minor league affiliates
Seattle Mariners minor league affiliates
Professional baseball teams in California
Baseball teams established in 1977
Baseball teams disestablished in 1981